Frenkiel is a surname. Notable people with the surname include:

François Frenkiel (1910–1986), American physicist
Stanisław Frenkiel (1918-2001), Polish artist and British art administrator and teacher
Paweł Frenkiel  (1920–1943), Polish Army officer and Jewish youth leader 
Richard H. Frenkiel (born 1943), American engineer

See also
Frenkel